Oberweimar station is a railway station in the Oberweimar district in the city of Weimar, located in Thuringia, Germany.

References

Railway stations in Thuringia
Buildings and structures in Weimar
Railway stations in Germany opened in 1897
1897 establishments in Prussia